The Music from Richard Diamond is an album by composer, arranger and conductor Pete Rugolo featuring compositions written for Richard Diamond, Private Detective recorded in 1959 and first released on the EmArcy label.

Track listing
All compositions by Pete Rugolo.

 "Richard Diamond Theme" - 1:43
 "Diamond On the Move"- 2:35
 "Fancy Meeting Karen (Love Theme from Richard Diamond)" - 3:26
 "I'm Always Chasing Butterflies" - 2:16
 "Who's Sam?" - 2:25
 "All Star" - 2:36
 "The Teaser" - 1:30
 "Ye Olde Curiosity Shape" - 3:29
 "Teen Age Rock" - 2:07
 "The Sleeve Job" - 2:10
 "Does Mama Know You're Out?" - 2:10
 "Richard Diamond's Blues" - 2:47

Recorded at United Recording Studios in Hollywood, CA on March 10, 1959 (tracks 1, 3, 9 & 12), March 31, 1959 (tracks 5, 6, 8 & 10) and April 9, 1959 (tracks 2, 4, 7 & 11).

Personnel
Pete Rugolo - arranger, conductor
Pete Candoli (tracks 1, 3, 5, 6, 9-10 & 12), Buddy Childers (tracks 2, 4-8, 10 & 11), Don Fagerquist (tracks 5, 6, 8 & 10), Ray Linn (tracks 2, 4, 7 & 11), Mickey Mangano (tracks 2, 4, 7 & 11), Ollie Mitchell (tracks 1, 3, 9 & 12), Jimmy Salko (tracks 2, 4, 7 & 11), Joe Triscari (tracks 1, 3, 5, 6, 9-10 & 12), Stu Williamson (tracks 1, 3, 9 & 12) - trumpet 
Milt Bernhart (tracks 1, 3, 5, 6, 9-10 & 12), Francis "Joe" Howard (tracks 1-4, 7, 9, 11 & 12), Frank Rosolino - trombone
George Roberts - bass trombone
Vincent DeRosa (tracks 5, 6, 8 & 10), Claude Sherry (tracks 2, 4, 7 & 11) - French horn
Paul Horn, Bud Shank - piccolo, flute, alto saxophone
Buddy Collette - tenor saxophone, clarinet, flute (tracks 2, 4, 7 & 11)
Bob Cooper - tenor saxophone, bass clarinet, flute
Chuck Gentry (tracks 1, 3, 9 & 12), Dale Issenhuth (tracks 2 4-8, 10 & 11) - baritone saxophone
Larry Bunker - vibraphone, percussion, bongos, xylophone (tracks 2, 4-8, 10 & 11)
Bernie Mattison - vibraphone, percussion (tracks 1, 3, 9 & 12)
Jimmy Rowles - piano
Al Viola - guitar
Edgar Lustgarten - cello 
 Rollie Bundock (tracks 2, 4, 7 & 11), Red Mitchell (tracks 1, 3, 5, 6, 9-10 & 12), Phil Stephens (tracks 2, 4-8, 10 & 11) - bass
Irving Kluger (tracks 2, 4, 7 & 11), Shelly Manne (tracks 1, 3, 5, 6, 9-10 & 12), - drums

References

Pete Rugolo albums
1959 albums
EmArcy Records albums
Albums arranged by Pete Rugolo
Albums conducted by Pete Rugolo